Budești may refer to several places:

Romania
Budești, a town in Călărași County
 Budești, Bistrița-Năsăud, a commune in Bistriţa-Năsăud County
 Budești, Maramureș, a commune in Maramureș County
 Budești, Vâlcea, a commune in Vâlcea County
 Budești, a village in Pleșcuța Commune, Arad County
 Budești, a village in Plopana Commune, Bacău County
 Budești, a village in Chiliile Commune, Buzău County
 Budești, a village in Mogoșești Commune, Iași County
 Budești, a village in Făurei Commune, Neamț County
 Budești, a village in Crețești Commune, Vaslui County
 Budești, a village in Diculești Commune, Vâlcea County
 Budești, a village in Cotești Commune, Vrancea County

Moldova
 Budești, Chișinău, a commune in Chișinău Municipality

See also 
 Buda (disambiguation)
 Budeni (disambiguation)